The Blakely Sandstone is a Middle Ordovician geologic formation in the Ouachita Mountains of Arkansas and Oklahoma. First described in 1892, this unit was not named until 1909 by Albert Homer Purdue in his study of the Ouachita Mountains of Arkansas. Purdue had initially named this unit the Caddo Shale at a 1907 Geological Society of America meeting, but later redefined and renamed the unit as the Ouachita Shale.  He again renamed the unit to the Blakely Sandstone in a letter to Edward Oscar Ulrich, to which Ulrich used in a 1911 publication, becoming the first reference using this name.  Ulrich assigned the Blakely Mountain in Garland County, Arkansas as the type locality, but did not designate a stratotype. As of 2017, a reference section for this unit has yet to be designated.

Paleofauna

Conodonts
 Cordylodus
 C. horridus
 Hisiodella
 H. holodentata
 Leptochirognathus
 L. quadratus
 Paraprioniodus
 P. costatus
 Periodon
 P. aculeatus
 Spinodus

Graptolites
 Dichograptus
 Didymograptus
 D. euodes
 D. manus
 D. spinosus
 Glossograptus
 G. echinatus
 G. horridus
 Phyllograptus
 Tetragraptus

See also

 List of fossiliferous stratigraphic units in Arkansas
 Paleontology in Arkansas

References

Ordovician geology of Oklahoma
Ordovician Arkansas
Ordovician southern paleotropical deposits